The Windsor-6-1 Representative District is a one-member state Representative district in the U.S. state of Vermont.  It is one of the 108 one or two member districts into which the state was divided by the redistricting and reapportionment plan developed by the Vermont General Assembly following the 2000 U.S. Census.  The plan applies to legislatures elected in 2002, 2004, 2006, 2008, and 2010.  A new plan will be developed in 2012 following the 2010 U.S. Census.

The Windsor-6-1 District includes all of the Windsor County towns of Barnard and Pomfret, as well as a part of the town of Hartford:

The rest of the town of Hartford is in Windsor-6-2.

As of the 2000 census, the state as a whole had a population of 608,827. As there are a total of 150 representatives, there were 4,059 residents per representative (or 8,118 residents per two representatives). The one member Windsor-6-1 District had a population of 4,224 in that same census, 4.07% above the state average.

District Representative
Michael S. Reese,   Democrat

See also
Members of the Vermont House of Representatives, 2005-2006 session
Vermont Representative Districts, 2002-2012

References

External links
Detail map of Windsor-6-1, and Windsor-6-2 (PDF)
Vermont Statute defining legislative districts
 Vermont House districts -- Statistics (PDF)

Vermont House of Representatives districts, 2002–2012
Barnard, Vermont
Hartford, Vermont
Pomfret, Vermont